National Tertiary Route 720, or just Route 720 (or ) is a National Road Route of Costa Rica, located in the Alajuela province.

Description
In Alajuela province the route covers Atenas canton (Concepción district).

References

Highways in Costa Rica